Amis-Bragg House is a historic home located at Jackson, Northampton County, North Carolina. It was built about 1840, and is a two-story, five bay, single-pile Greek Revival style frame house with a two-story ell and one-story kitchen wing.  It has a hipped roof and interior end chimneys.  It was the home of Thomas Bragg Jr. (1810-1872), North Carolina governor and member of the United States Senate, purchased the house in 1843 and lived here until 1855.

It was listed on the National Register of Historic Places in 2003.

References

Houses on the National Register of Historic Places in North Carolina
Greek Revival houses in North Carolina
Houses completed in 1840
Bragg family residences
Houses in Northampton County, North Carolina
National Register of Historic Places in Northampton County, North Carolina